Piso is an unincorporated community located in Pike County, Kentucky, United States. Their post office  has been closed. The community was named by Bud Williamson after viewing an advertisement for medicine in an almanac.

References

Unincorporated communities in Pike County, Kentucky
Unincorporated communities in Kentucky